The Philippines women's national beach handball team is the national team of the Philippines. It takes part in international beach handball competitions and is governed by the Philippine Handball Federation.

The women's national team has participated in the Asian Beach Games, particularly in the 2012 and 2014 editions.

Squad
Roster for the 2014 Asian Beach Games.

1:Katherine May Binamira
3: Michelle Bruzola
5: Maria Ana Fatima Tolentino
6: Aurora Adriano
9: Marilourd Socorro Borja
11: Mary Angeli Cabochan
12: Luzviminda Pacubas
13: Legiel Ortencio
14: Andrea Johanna Montalbo
16: Jennifer Del Villar

Results

Beach Handball World Championships

2004-2022: Did Not Enter

2024: Qualified

Asian Beach Handball Championship
 Champions   Runners up   Third place   Fourth place

Asian Beach Games
 Champions   Runners up   Third place   Fourth place

Southeast Asian Beach Handball Championship
 Champions   Runners up   Third place   Fourth place

Coach
 Joanna Franquelli (2012-)

References

Women's national beach handball teams
Women's national sports teams of the Philippines